Heartful is the fifth studio album by Japanese pop band AAA. It was released on February 17, 2010, by their label Avex Trax. Three singles were released to promote the album, "Break Down/Break Your Name/Summer Revolution/", "Hide-away", and "Heart and Soul".

Singles
The first single released from the album was the triple A-side single, "Break Down/Summer Revolution/Say Your Name". It was released on July 29, 2009. The single charted at No. 3 on the Oricon single charts. The second single was "Hide-away", which was released October 21, 2009 and charted at No. 2. The third and final single from the album was "Heart and Soul", which peaked at No. 3.

Track listing

Charts

References

External links
 Heartful special website 

2010 albums
AAA (band) albums
Avex Group albums